Samson & Gert is a Flemish children's television series produced by Eline van Noppen, centered on the talking dog Samson and his owner Gert. In its entire run, the show was originally aired on TV1 from Christmas Day 1989 until 1 December 1997, where it moved to Ketnet and continues airing all of its episodes to this day.

History 
Originally Gert Verhulst was a continuity announcer. He wanted to make the announcements before children's television programmes more appealing by having an animal puppet next to him. He got in touch with puppeteer Danny Verbiest, who created the puppet dog Samson. Samson, a Bearded Collie, made his screen debut in the Christmas period of 1989.

The pair's popularity grew very rapidly in Flanders and they were given their own television series in 1990. The show, named Samson, premiered on 2 September 1990. During the show, Samson and Gert and their friends would encounter many funny and chaotic situations. The plot would be interrupted for contests, fan mail and a variety of cartoons, such as The Smurfs, Ovide and the Gang, and Mrs. Pepper Pot.

The production of new episodes ceased in 2005, but the series is still broadcast in Flanders and the Netherlands and is very popular with children. Danny Verbiest also announced his retirement in 2005. Many fans were upset by this, because Danny Verbiest gave a really special, unique and specific voice to Samson. Peter Thyssen took over and did his best to make Samson sound the same. Even though episodes were no longer being produced, many theater shows and songs continued to be made, with the annual Kerstshows or Christmas shows every winter being the most prominent.

In 2014 Peter Thyssen stopped portraying Samson and Dirk Bosschaert took over. In 2014, after 10 years of absence, they produced a brand new season. The season was called 'Winterpret'. It took place in three bungalows in the Ardennes during the winter. The characters of Gert, Samson, the mayor, Van Leemhuyzen and Alberto returned. The main set was the bungalow of Samson & Gert, which had the same layout as their house. In 2017 they produced another special season, called 'Zomerpret' with a summer theme. The previous cast of 'Winterpret' re-appeared and a new character was introduced. This characters was 'Jaap Mengelmoes' and was the owner of the camping where Samson & Gert would stay in. Jaap Mengelmoes also happened to be the cousin of former neighbour Joop Mengelmoes.

Samson and Gert's first movie, Hotel op Stelten ("Panic in the Hotel"), premiered on 12 March 2008. It also stars their friends Alberto, Octaaf, the mayor and Van Leemhuyzen.

On 2 April 2019, Gert Verhulst announced that he would quit at their 30th anniversary, leaving Samson in need of a new owner. At the first performance of their farewell tour on 21 December 2019, it was finally revealed that this role will be fulfilled by Marie Verhulst (the daughter of Gert). The final performance was initially planned for 19 April 2020. However, as the pandemic hit in March, the rest of the tour had to be postponed for two years. In the end, Gert's very last performance took place on 16 April 2022, finally saying goodbye to his role after 32 years.

The new show is called Samson and Marie. While Gert is no longer present, the mayor, Van Leemhuyzen and Alberto still appear in the new show from time to time. They will also appear in the very first Samson & Marie Christmas show.

Concept and characters 
Samson is a sweet naive Bearded Collie who can speak but consistently mispronounces certain words and cannot get names right. His best friend is his owner Gert. Samson is in love with Bobientje, another Bearded Collie, and Gert is in love with Marlène. Bobientje and Marlène are both unseen characters, but are mentioned in almost every episode.

Samson and Gert live together in a big house at 101 Main Street, where a lot of funny and chaotic situations take place. Their original (clumsy) neighbour, Joop Mengelmoes, broke the doorbell at the house when they first met, in the very first episode. Every visitor now enters the house with the catchphrase "I had to knock because the doorbell is broken" - one of many catchphrases in the programme.

The village mayor, Modest, seems more interested in model aircraft than in his work as mayor. He always makes the same speech: "To those who are present: congratulations! To those who are absent: congratulations as well!". He is assisted by his playful and hyperactive secretary Eugène Van Leemhuyzen. The minister's delegate regularly pays a visit to the town, but his visits always occur at the worst possible time.

The local grocery store is run by Octaaf De Bolle and his overbearing mother Jeannine. Octaaf is extremely conceited and vain, but in reality he is nothing but a bungler. He is the president of the local gymnastics club and he thinks of himself as an athlete. He also has a teenage daughter, Miranda. His mother Jeannine is the proud president of the local crafts club. Just like her son, Jeannine is not afraid to brag.

The town's best (and only) hairdresser is Albert Vermeersch. He does not get many customers, so he eats a lot to pass the time. Aside from eating, Albert enjoys singing and is an active participant in the local opera company, although the others don't like his singing. He wants to be called "Alberto Vermicelli", because this name fits him more as an opera singer. Gert still calls him by his real name, which always annoys him. Since Samson can't pronounce "vermicelli", he just calls him "Mr. Spaghetti". Although it was never revealed in the series, Albert is seen as a homosexual by the audience. In 2009, actor Koen Crucke, who played the role, told the Belgian newspaper Het Nieuwsblad Albert is based upon the role of the gay hairdresser he played in the movie Koko Flanel but does not reveal anything about the sexual orientation of Albert.

As in every Belgian village, there is a friture (chip shop). The owner of the friture, Fred Kroket, is an unseen character who tries to sell jars of mayonnaise and pickles by phone. He retired from business in 2001, after which his cousin Frieda took over. Frieda immediately fell in love with Albert, but sadly her love remained unrequited.

All characters have multiple recognizable catchphrases. Octaaf's most famous catchphrase is, "This happens to be one of my specialties. My Miranda always says that too. 'Dad,' she says, 'the way you [...], well... that way I [...]."

Cast overview 

A couple of characters are often mentioned but never shown on screen: Fred Kroket, Albert's mother and uncle, Gert's love rival Jean-Louis Michel and the mayor's housekeeper Marie. After Ann Petersen and Walter Van De Velde left the series, their characters Jeannine and Octaaf became unseen characters as well. Van De Velde reprised his role as Octaaf one final time in the movie. Eugène Van Leemhuyzen was an unseen character before he debuted on the show in 1998.

Other activities

Music 
Samson and Gert released their first CD in March 1991. 16 CDs have been released since.

Theater shows 
Since 1991, Samson and Gert have hosted an annual theater show during the Christmas and New Year holiday period, the Samson & Gert Christmas Show. During these theater shows, Samson and Gert perform their most popular songs while their friends try to entertain the audience. Even though no new episodes have been produced since 2005, the theater shows are still being held each year.

From 1991 to 1999, Samson and Gert also went on a theater tour during the summer season, touring Flanders in a circus tent. The summer shows have been held in Plopsaland since the theme park opened in 2000.

Comics 

From 1993 to 2005 a comics series was launched. It was written by Danny Verbiest, Gert Verhulst and Hans Bourlon, while the stories were drawn by Jean-Pol, Luc Morjaeu, Wim Swerts and Bruno De Roover. The series was notable for giving some of the unseen characters in the TV series a visual appearance. 33 albums were published.

Software 
Several interactive CD-ROM adventures were developed for Mac and Windows, all developed by Stefan Bracke, among them "Op reis with Samson & Gert"

Film 

Samson and Gert's first movie,  (Panic at the Hotel), premiered on 12 March 2008. It features their friends Alberto, Octaaf, mayor Modest and Eugène. The plot focuses on an abandoned hotel owned by the family of Marlène. The building, being in bad repair, has to be demolished to make room for a high-rise building. Gert, who will do everything for his love, offers Marlène his help to rescue the hotel. The government allows Gert and his friends one week to restore the building and save it from demolition. Naturally the film is full of silly situations. Then there is the story of the two thieves. When Gert was a little boy, he played a lot with Marlène at the hotel which was still in use. At one day, two thieves had to hide a way from the police because they had stolen a very expensive diamond. They put the diamond away in a ball in the basement and ran off but got caught anyway. When they heard that the hotel was opened again during restoration for a test-public, they escaped from prison and dressed themselves as a couple to enter the hotel. The police started looking for them and informed Gert and Samson. After a long time, Gert realized that the strange couple were the two thieves. Because of this, the government gave the permission to keep the hotel, and financed the rest of the restoration.

References

External links 

 
 Fansite
 

Belgian children's television shows
1989 Belgian television series debuts
1997 Belgian television series endings
1980s Belgian television series
1990s Belgian television series
Fictional Belgian people
Television shows about dogs
Television duos
Belgian television shows featuring puppetry
Television shows adapted into plays
Television shows adapted into films
Television shows adapted into comics
Eén original programming